Rhyothemis princeps, known as the sapphire flutterer, is a species of dragonfly of the family Libellulidae.
The flight of the genus Rhyothemis is usually fluttering, leading to the common description of "flutterer" for most species in the genus.

Rhyothemis princeps is found in Australia and New Guinea only. It is a medium-sized dragonfly (wingspan 70mm, length 40mm) that inhabits a variety of freshwater lakes, ponds, and swamps. It has a dark blue to black abdomen, and its wings are dark, with two or three pale patches on the outer section. Males have dark patches extending to their wingtips, whereas females have clear wingtips. In sunlight the dark colours can reflect a metallic purplish tinge. In Australia its range is limited to north-eastern Queensland from Cape York Peninsula to around Rockhampton.

Gallery

See also
 List of Odonata species of Australia

References

Libellulidae
Odonata of Australia
Odonata of Asia
Insects of New Guinea
Taxa named by William Forsell Kirby
Insects described in 1894